Wallersteiner v Moir [1974] 1 WLR 991 is a UK company law case concerning piercing the corporate veil.

This case was followed by a connected decision, Wallersteiner v Moir (No 2), that concerned the principles behind a derivative claim.

Facts
Dr Wallersteiner had bought a company called Hartley Baird Ltd using money from the company itself, in contravention of the prohibitions on financial assistance (under Companies Act 1948 s 54 and 190). He had got 80% of the company. Mr Moir was one of the 20% remainder shareholders. Wanting to expose Dr Wallersteiner's various dealings, he circulated a letter to shareholders. Dr Wallersteiner sued for libel.

Judgment
Geoffrey Lane J at first instance struck out the claim for want of prosecution, as it was apparent that Dr Wallersteiner was just biding time. But he also entered judgment against Dr Wallersteiner. He appealed.

Lord Denning MR in a condemnatory judgment held that Dr Wallersteiner's delays were "intentional and contumelious", and the action for libel should be struck out. In the course of the conclusion he noted that various Liechtensteinian companies which Dr Wallersteiner held, could be accessed to get back the ill-gotten gains, and he thought so on this basis. He went on,

See also

UK company law
Wallersteiner v Moir (No 2) [1975] QB 373, a successor case concerning a derivative claim that Dr Wallersteiner also lost
Littlewoods Mail Order Stores v IRC [1969] 1 WLR 1241

Notes

References

United Kingdom company case law
United Kingdom corporate personality case law
Court of Appeal (England and Wales) cases
1974 in case law
1974 in British law